Paramphilius trichomycteroides is a species of loach catfish found in Guinea, Guinea-Bissau, Liberia, Senegal and Sierra Leone.  It grows to a length of 5.9 cm.

References

 

Amphiliidae
Freshwater fish of West Africa
Fish described in 1907